Valerie Van Peel (born 11 October 1979 in Kalmthout) is a Belgian politician, journalist and television presenter who is a member of the Member of the Chamber of Representatives for the New Flemish Alliance party.

Biography 
Van Peel studied communication sciences at Ghent University followed by a master's degree in journalism. She then worked for NRC Handelsblad in Rotterdam and as a reporter and presenter for Het Nieuwsblad and Actua TV. In the municipal elections of 2012, she was elected as councilor for the N-VA in Kapellen before resigning in 2019 to focus on her parliamentary functions. In the 2014 Belgian federal election, she was elected to the Member of the Chamber of Representatives for the Antwerp constituency. In 2021, she was appointed vice-chairwoman of the N-VA. Van Peel is a feminist but has written in support of scrapping positive discrimination in politics.

References 

1979 births
Living people
Members of the Chamber of Representatives (Belgium)
Belgian journalists
New Flemish Alliance politicians
Ghent University alumni
21st-century Belgian politicians
21st-century Belgian women politicians
Belgian feminists